The 1998 European Korfball Championship was held in Estoril (Portugal) with 8 national teams in competition, from 16–19 April.

First round

Final round 
19-04-1998

Final standings

See also 
European Korfball Championship
International Korfball Federation

References

External links 
International Korfball Federation

European Korfball Championship
1998 in korfball
Korfball in Portugal